Birinci Sixli (Birinci Şıxlı) is a populated place (class P - Populated Place) in (Qazax), Azerbaijan (Asia) with the region font code of Russia/ Central Asia. Its coordinates are 41°17'5" N and 45°9'33" E in DMS (Degrees Minutes Seconds) or 41.2847 and 45.1592 (in decimal degrees).
Birinci Şıxlı (also, Birindzhi-Shikhly, Pervyye Shikhly, Shikhili, Shikhly, and Shykhly Pervyye) is a village and municipality in the Qazakh Rayon of Azerbaijan.  It has a population of 3,177.

References 

Populated places in Qazax District